Mount Hay, a mountain that is part of the Mt Hay Range of the Blue Mountains Range which is a spur off the Great Dividing Range, is located in the Blue Mountains National Park, New South Wales, Australia. Mount Hay is approximately  AMSL and is one of several basalt caps located within the UNESCO World Heritage Greater Blue Mountains Area.

Description
Mount Hay has a dome-like shape at the summit and it can be found on the southern escarpment of the Grose Valley, one of the main valleys of the Blue Mountains. There is a walking track that goes to the top of the mountain, but the initial approach is via the Mount Hay Road, which branches off from the Great Western Highway at the town of Leura. The latter is extremely basic, with an unreliable water tank, a stone fireplace and enough room for one tent at a pinch.

From the picnic area, a track goes to the mountain, which is just over a kilometre away. There are good views of the Grose Valley as the track approaches the mountain, but the views disappear as the track gets higher up. At the top, there is a trigonometric station, but there are no views because of the timber.

Activities

The area is popular for bushwalking but not as overused as some parts of the Grose Valley, because it is some distance from the nearest residential areas. There is also a short walk to the top of the plateau known as Flat Top. Just a little north of the picnic area, there is another track that goes west to Butterbox Point, which provides dramatic views of the valley. The area is also popular for photography because of the extensive valley views. There are no authorised camp sites, but camping is allowed at a reasonable distance from any road. From the summit, Sydney central business district is barely visible in the far distance.

See also

List of mountains in New South Wales

References

Hay
H